PANDIT is a database of multiple sequence alignments and phylogenetic trees covering many common protein domains.

See also
 Pfam: database of protein domains
 Phylogeny
 Sequence alignment

References

External links
 http://www.ebi.ac.uk/goldman-srv/pandit

Biological databases
Computational phylogenetics
Genetics in the United Kingdom
Protein domains
Science and technology in Cambridgeshire
South Cambridgeshire District